Eric Bass (born William Frederic Bass, Jr., October 23, 1974) is an American musician, songwriter, and producer, best known as the current bassist for the American rock band Shinedown.

Personal life 

Bass was born into a conservative, and very musical family, and was encouraged to sing and play piano from an early age. At 13 he received a trombone, before moving onto guitar the following Christmas.  In highschool he played drums in the marching band, which he recalls as being rhythmically invaluable to me throughout my music career.

Bass currently lives in Charleston, SC with his wife and their two dogs. He owned a recording studio called Ocean Industries Studios (www.32tracks.com), which was his second studion, and now owns a studio called "Big Animal Studio", in which he recorded and produced Planet Zero.

Bass is known to suffer from depression, which influenced his work, especially in Shinedown's sixth album, Attention Attention, which was influenced by Bass' condition along with frontman Brent Smith's addiction.Rachel Leah, Rock band Shinedown removes the stigma around mental health and addiction in "Attention Attention", September 16, 2018, SalonSteve Baltin, How Shinedown Got Real On 'Attention Attention' | Mental Health Awareness Month, May 31, 2018, Grammy Awards

In September 2021, it was reported that Bass tested positive for COVID-19, and would miss a few shows during the band's tour.SHINEDOWN Bassist ERIC BASS Tests Positive For COVID-19; Band To Play Next Two Shows As A Three-Piece, September 25, 2021, Blabbermouth

Career
Deepfield

In 2002 Eric formed Deepfield with Baxter Teal. By 2003 they were signed to In De Goot records/McGathy Promotions, and began to produce their first record. However, Eric soon left the band after becoming more and more drawn by the producing, recording and studio process.

Shinedown

Bass joined Shinedown in 2008, before the release of The Sound of Madness, as a permanent replacement for Brad Stewart. He did not record the album with the band (the album's bass parts were contributed by noted session bassist Chris Chaney), but is now touring with them. In addition to his bass duties, he also plays the keyboard in concert and contributes backing vocals.

Bass soon became a prominent member in Shinedown, and wrote many of their songs, starting in Amaryllis. After producing a few singles for the band, such as "Diamond Eyes" and Cut the Cord, in 2018 he produced Shinedown's sixth album, Attention Attention,Raul Amador, Interview with Bassist Eric Bass, May 14, 2018, Bass Musician and in 2022 he produced their seventh album, Planet Zero in his new studio, "Big Animal Studio".

Influences
Bass never learned to play a guitar (or a bass guitar), and is self taught.

He was influenced by bass players Robert DeLeo (STP), Chris Wolstenholme (Muse), Tim Commerford (Rage Against The Machine), and by producers etc.: Rich Costey, Brendan O'Brien, Howard Benson, Andy Wallace, Chris Lord Alge.

Producer
 Framing Hanley - The Sum of Who We Are (2014)
 Sleeper Agent - About Last Night (2014)
 Cold Kingdom - Cold Kingdom (2017)
 Shinedown - Attention Attention (2018)
 Shinedown - Planet Zero'' (2022)

Equipment
 2008-2012 - Ernie Ball Music Man Sterling Bass
 2012-2019 - Dean Eric Bass Hillsboro Bass
 2019–Present - Prestige Eric Bass Signature Bass

References

External links 
 Shinedown.com

Musicians from Charleston, South Carolina
Year of birth missing (living people)
Living people
Shinedown members